The 2018 IIHF Challenge Cup of Asia Division I was the 5th IIHF Challenge Cup of Asia Division I competition, an annual international ice hockey tournament held by the International Ice Hockey Federation (IIHF). The Division I competition took place from 24 to 29 March 2018 at the Malaysia National Ice Skating Stadium in Kuala Lumpur, Malaysia. Four teams competed in the tournament. Originally, six teams were scheduled to compete. However, Oman and Qatar were scheduled to compete, but cancelled. Indonesia made its debut in the Challenge Cup of Asia. The host nation Malaysia won its first Division I tournament, winning all five of its games, defeating Macau in the final and promoted to Top Division for the 2019 IIHF Challenge Cup of Asia.

Participants

Match officials
4 referees and 6 linesmen were selected for the tournament.

Referees
  Yu Jin Ang
  Feng Lei
  Francois Emmanuel Gautier
  Ryan Hissong

Linesmen
  Raedeni Atmaja
  Anton Boryayev
  Yong Elbert Cheah
  Qiwei Benjamin Huang
  Tam Weng Leong
  Chun Wong

Standings

Schedules
All times are in Malaysia Standard Time (UTC+8).

Preliminary round

Bracket

Semifinals

Third place game

Final

Final ranking

(H) Host; (P) Promoted.Source: IIHF

References

IIHF Challenge Cup of Asia
IIHF Challenge Cups of Asia
IIHF Challenge Cup of Asia
March 2018 sports events in Malaysia